Chleby is a municipality and village in Nymburk District in the Central Bohemian Region of the Czech Republic. It has about 400 inhabitants.

Administrative parts
The village of Draho is an administrative part of Chleby.

Geography
It lies in a flat agricultural landscape in the Central Elbe Table.

History
The first written mention of Chleby is from 1292, when the monastery in Mnichovo Hradiště sold the village to the Sedlec Abbey.

Sights
The landmark of Chleby is the Church of Saint Lawrence. It was built in the late Baroque style in 1780–1782 and the tower was added in the mid-19th century.

The Evangelical church was built in the Neoromanesque style in 1885–1888, after the old one was demolished.

Chleby is known for the Chleby Zoo, one of the smallest zoos in the country.

References

External links

Villages in Nymburk District